Phulbari is an upazila of Kurigram District in the Division of Rangpur, Bangladesh.

Geography
It has 25236 households and total area 163.63 km2.

Lalmonirhat is connected by kulaghat-Sonaikazi river crossing on Dharla river.

It is bounded by Parbatipur and Chirirbandar upazilas on the north, Birampur upazila on the south, Nawabganj of Dinajpur and Birampur upazilas on the east, West Bengal state of India on the west.

Demographics
As of the 1991 Bangladesh census, Phulbari has a population of 129,668. Males constitute 50.49% of the population, and females 49.51%. This Upazila's population over the age of eighteen is 62,699. Phulbari has an average literacy rate of 24% (7+ years), and the national average of 32.4% literate.

Administration
Phulbari Thana, formed in 1857, was turned into an upazila in 1984.

Phulbari Upazila is divided into six union parishads: Baravita, Bhangamor, Kashipur, Nawdanga, Phulbari, and Shimulbari. The union parishads are subdivided into 50 mauzas and 166 villages.

The name of the  Upazila Chairman is Golam Rabbani Sarkar.

See also
Upazilas of Bangladesh
Districts of Bangladesh
Divisions of Bangladesh

References

Upazilas of Kurigram District